A.T.Mödell is an electro-industrial Spanish band formed in 2009.

Discography

According to the information available on the official website, the first album of the band, Noise Therapy, was distributed under a Creative Commons license in 2011, and on 21 September 2012 a special, remastered edition of Noise Therapy was released also under a Creative Commons license, labelled Noise Therapy (Special Treatment edition). This album included a bonus CD with remixes done by Julio Nexus (frontman of Interfront/Megabeat) and was named Nexus Therapy. This albums are available as a free download in the official website, among others.

On 24 May 2013, their second studio album, Apocalyptophilia, was released through Danse Macabre Records.

On 1 October 2014, their third studio album, Wired for evil, was released through online services such as Amazon, Spotify and Google Play. This time the album has been self-produced. After some months it was released as a completely free of charge download at their website.

On 30 October 2015, their fourth studio album, Epic Nightmares, was released directly as a free download at their website.

References

External links 
 Official website
 Review of Noise Therapy at Brutal Resonance
 Review of Apocalyptophilia at Brutal Resonance
 Review of Apocalyptophilia at Side-Line Magazine
 A.T.Mödell at Discogs
 Piece of news about the release of the album Wired for evil at La Estadea (in spanish)
 Review of Wired for evil at Brutal Resonance
 Review of Epic Nightmares at Side-Line Magazine

Electro-industrial music groups
Spanish musical groups
Musical groups established in 2009
2009 establishments in Spain